Dalby is a Scandinavian place name meaning "valley settlement", during the Viking Age, the name was brought to England and it later also became an English surname. It can be a locational surname for those from Dalby, Lincolnshire, near Spilsby; in Dalby, Leicestershire near Melton Mowbray, and in Dalby, North Yorkshire, near Terrington. Notable people with the surname include:

Amy Dalby, British actress
Andrew Dalby, linguist and culinary writer
Andy Dalby, guitarist
Claire Dalby, British artist
C. Reginald Dalby, British illustrator
Dave Dalby, former NFL football player
David Dalby, British linguist, founder of Linguasphere Observatory
Greg Dalby, American soccer player
Håkan Dahlby, Swedish double trap shooter 
Irene Dalby, Norwegian swimmer
Isaac Dalby (1744–1824), English mathematician and surveyor
John Dalby (1929–2017), English singer and composer
John Dalby (painter) (1810–1865), English painter
Liza Dalby (born 1950), American anthropologist and writer
Matthew Dalby, British scientist
Mark Dalby (1938–2013), British Anglican Archdeacon
Martin Dalby (1942–2018), Scottish composer
Nicolas Dalby, Danish mixed martial artist
Richard Dalby (disambiguation)
Robert Dalby, English martyr
William Bartlett Dalby (1840–1918), British aural surgeon and otologisthe

References

Danish-language surnames
English toponymic surnames